Optics Communications is a peer-reviewed scientific journal published by Elsevier. It covers all fields of optical science and technology and was established in 1969.

Abstracting and indexing
The journal is abstracted and indexed in:
Chemical Abstracts 
Current Contents/Engineering, Computing & Technology 
Current Contents/Physics, Chemical, & Earth Sciences 
Ei Compendex
Engineering Index 
Inspec
Scopus
According to the Journal Citation Reports, the journal has a 2020 impact factor of 2.31.

References

External links

Optics journals
Elsevier academic journals
Publications established in 1969
English-language journals
Biweekly journals